Copiopteryx derceto is a moth of the family Saturniidae. It is found in South America, including Brazil.

External links
 Species info

Arsenurinae
Moths described in 1872